This is a list of seasons completed by the Tulsa Golden Hurricane men's college basketball team.

Seasons

	
 Bill Franey finished the season as interim coach, going 2–7 and 2–5 in conference. King began the season, going 6–12 and 3–6 in conference.
 Pooh Williamson finished the season as interim coach, going 7–15 and 5–13 in conference. Phillips began the season, going 2–2.

Notes

Tulsa Golden Hurricane
 
Tulsa Golden Hurricane basketball seasons